...In Shallow Seas We Sail is the fourth studio album from post-hardcore band Emery that was released on June 2, 2009, through Tooth & Nail Records. The tracks "The Smile, The Face" and "Edge of the World" were previously released on Emery's 2008 EP, While Broken Hearts Prevail. The first track off of the record, "Cutthroat Collapse", was released as a digital download on April 7, 2009. The album debuted at number 50 on the Billboard 200.  On June 20, 2009, the album hit number 1 on the Billboard Christian Albums chart.

Track listing

Personnel
Emery
Toby Morell – co-lead vocals, unclean vocals, bass
Matt Carter – guitar, backing vocals
Josh Head – keyboards, unclean vocals, electronics 
Devin Shelton – co-lead vocals, bass
Dave Powell – drums, percussion

Production
Produced and recorded by Aaron Sprinkle and Matt Carter
Recorded at The Compound and Tigertown Studios
Tracks 1, 3 and 4 mixed by Dan Korneff at House of Loud
Tracks 2 and 5 mixed by David Bendeth at House of Loud
Tracks 6, 7, 9, 10 and 12 mixed by JR McNeely at Elm Studios South
Tracks 8 and 11 mixed by David Bendeth and Dan Korneff at House of Loud
Mastered by Troy Glessner at Spectre South
Executive producer: Brandon Ebel

Art
Art direction by Emery and Jordan Butcher
Design by Jordan Butcher
Illustrations by Marc Johns
Photography by Dave Hill

References

Emery (band) albums
2009 albums
Tooth & Nail Records albums
Albums produced by Aaron Sprinkle